Tom Wilhelmsen may refer to:
Tom Wilhelmsen (shipping magnate) (1911–1978), Norwegian shipping magnate
Tom Wilhelmsen (baseball) (born 1983), American professional baseball pitcher

See also
 Thomas Wilhelmsen (born 1974), Norwegian shipping magnate